The 2015–16 Euroleague Top 16 was played from 29 December 2015 to 7 April 2016. A total of 16 teams competed in the Top 16 to decide the 8 places in the Playoffs.

Format
In each group, teams played against each other home-and-away in a round-robin format. The matchdays were 29–30 December, 7–8 January, 14–15 January, 21–22 January, 28–29 January, 4–5 February, 11–12 February, 25–26 February, 3–4 March, 10–11 March, 17–18 March, 24–25 March, 31 March–1 April and 6–7 April 2016.

The four first qualified teams advanced to the Playoffs, while the four last qualified teams were eliminated.

A total of 8 countries were represented in the Top 16. Cedevita and Darüşşafaka Doğuş made their debut appearances in the Top 16 of the modern era of Euroleague Basketball.

Tiebreakers
If teams are level on record at the end of the Top 16, tiebreakers are applied in the following order:
 Head-to-head record.
 Head-to-head point differential.
 Point differential during the Top 16.
 Points scored during the Top 16.
 Sum of quotients of points scored and points allowed in each Top 16 match.

Groups

Group E

Group F

External links
Official website

2015–16 Euroleague